The 1938 Kentucky Derby was the 64th running of the Kentucky Derby. The race took place on May 7, 1938.

Full results

 Winning breeder: Herbert M. Woolf (KS)

References

1938
Kentucky Derby
Derby